Poison Idéal is the second studio album by French singer Steeve Estatof. The album, reaching 68th on the French chart, was released on 16 May 2008 via Sony BMG.

Track listing 

 "Bomb Baby" contains an interpolation of Tigertailz' 1989 single "Love Bomb Baby", written by Ace Finchum, Kim Hooker, Jay Pepper & Pepsi Tate.
 "Viens Te Faire Chahuter" is a cover of Michel Polnareff's 1985 single.

Charts

References 

2008 albums
Sony BMG albums
Steeve Estatof albums